Djadja & Dinaz is a French hip hop duo from Meaux and made up of Gianni Bellou (Djadja) and Azzedine Hedhli (Dinaz).

Biography 
The group received attention in December 2014 with the controversial video for their song "Laisse-nous faire notre biff" which shows a dozen young people shooting firearms in a parking lot. The two rappers (Djadja and Dinaz) and three of the extras were subsequently identified by the police, and four of them were sentenced to three months in prison.

The group had further success in 2016 with the video for their song J'fais mes affaires accumulating 40 million views in February 2017.

The group released their first studio album named On s'promet on May 6, 2016. The album sold 7,000 copies in its first week. The album is certified platinum in February 2017 for selling over 100,000 copies in France.

Discography

Albums

Singles

*Did not appear in the official Belgian Ultratop 50 charts, but rather in the bubbling under Ultratip charts.

Other charting songs

*Did not appear in the official Belgian Ultratop 50 charts, but rather in the bubbling under Ultratip charts.

References 

French hip hop groups
French people of Tunisian descent
French people of Algerian descent
Rappers from Seine-et-Marne